Mikołaj Olędzki (usually Anglicised to Mikolaj Oledzki) (born 11 August 1998) is an England international rugby league footballer who plays as a  for the Leeds Rhinos in the Super League.

Oledzki has spent time on loan from Leeds at the Bradford Bulls and Featherstone Rovers in the Championship.

Background 
Oledzki was born in Gdańsk. He then moved to the UK when he was nine years old. Oledzki's family settled initially in Corby, Northamptonshire. He then began to excel at swimming, appearing for Northamptonshire's county team from a young age. But when they moved closer to his uncle in Leeds, he discovered rugby league.

He is the only Polish rugby league footballer to play in the Super League, and the second Polish player to the play the professional game ever, after rugby union player Grzegorz Kacała briefly switched to league to play for Paris St-Germain in 1996.

Playing career

Leeds Rhinos 
In 2017 he made his début for Leeds against Doncaster in the fifth round of the Challenge Cup, scoring a try in the 63rd minute of a 64–28 win.

On 17 October 2020, he played in the 2020 Challenge Cup Final victory for Leeds over Salford at Wembley Stadium.

He played a total of 15 games for Leeds in the 2021 Super League season including the club's 36–8 loss against St Helens in the semi-final.

On 24 September 2022, he played for Leeds in their 24-12 loss to St Helens RFC in the 2022 Super League Grand Final.

Oledzki was named in the 2022 Betfred Super League Dream Team at prop

Bradford Bulls 
He joined Bradford on a loan deal in February 2017. He featured in Round 1 (Hull Kingston Rovers).

Featherstone Rovers 
While on a dual-registration Mikolaj has played for Featherstone Rovers during the season 2017, and 2018.

International career 
In July 2018 he was selected in the England Knights Performance squad. Later that year he was selected for the England Knights on their tour of Papua New Guinea. He played against Papua New Guinea at the Oil Search National Football Stadium.

In 2019 he was selected for the England Knights against Jamaica at Headingley Rugby Stadium.

In October 2021, he made his Test debut for England against France. He was named in England's World Cup squad.

Personal life 
He attended Mount St. Mary's Catholic High School in Leeds between 2010 and 2015. He studied at Notre Dame Catholic Sixth Form in Leeds and won their 'Sports Person of the Year Award' for his efforts in the sport of Rugby League with the Leeds Rhinos.

In January 2018 Mikolaj announced via Instagram that he and his partner are expecting their first child.

References

External links 

Leeds Rhinos profile
Leeds Rhinos Academy profile
SL profile
England profile
Leeds Rhinos v Doncaster

1998 births
Living people
Bradford Bulls players
England national rugby league team players
England Knights national rugby league team players
Featherstone Rovers players
Leeds Rhinos players
Polish sportsmen
Polish rugby league players
Rugby league second-rows
Sportspeople from Gdańsk
Polish emigrants to the United Kingdom
Rugby league players from Leeds